Lot 33 is a township in Queens County, Prince Edward Island, Canada.  It is part of Charlotte Parish. Lot 33 was awarded to Colonel Richard Worge in the 1767 land lottery.

References

33
Geography of Queens County, Prince Edward Island